Gazi Shahabuddin Ahmed ( – 9 June 2017) was a Bangladeshi editor, intellectual and publisher. He was the founder and editor of Sachitra Shandhani.

Early life and education
Ahmed was a descendant of Fazl Gazi, zamindar of Bhawal Estate (now Gazipur, named after the family), and one of the Baro-Bhuyan of Bengal. He was the eldest son of 11 children of Gazi Shamsuddin Ahmed, an inspector general of police, and Gazi Rafia Khatun, an entrepreneur. While studying at Notre Dame College, Dhaka, he published and edited Sachitra Shandhani in 1956, at the age of 17. The publication ran until 1996. It published notable writings including Jahanara Imam's wartime journal, Ekatturer Dinguli.
His uncle Gazi Nurun Newaz was the founder and chairman of Bangladesh's first ceramic industry Peoples Ceramic Industries Limited.

Career
Ahmed had a publishing house, Shondhani Prokashoni.

Personal life
Ahmed was married to Bithi since 1964. Together they had a son, Shoubhro and a daughter, Sharmeen.

References

1939 births
2017 deaths
People from Dhaka
Bangladeshi journalists
Bangladeshi publishers (people)
Burials at Banani Graveyard
Notre Dame College, Dhaka alumni
Bangladeshi people of Middle Eastern descent
20th-century Bengalis
21st-century Bengalis